Image is an American quarterly literary journal that publishes art and writing engaging or grappling with Judeo-Christian faith. The journal's byline is "Art, Faith, Mystery". Image features fiction, poetry, painting, sculpture, architecture, film, music and dance. The journal also sponsors the Glen Workshops, the Arts & Faith discussion forum, the Milton Fellowship for writers working on their first book, the summer Luci Shaw Fellowship for undergraduates and the Denise Levertov Award.

Material first published in Image has appeared in Harper's Magazine, The Best American Essays, The Pushcart Prize: Best of the Small Presses, The Best Spiritual Writing, The O. Henry Prize Stories, The Art of the Essay, New Stories from the South, The Best American Movie Writing, and The Best Christian Writing. In 2000 and 2003, Image was nominated by Utne Reader for an Independent Press Award in the category of Spiritual Coverage.

History 
Image was established in 1989 by founding editor Gregory Wolfe and is based at Seattle Pacific University.  Image was involved with the founding of Seattle Pacific University's Master of Fine Arts degree, which launched in 2005. and is guided by writers such as Scott Cairns, Robert Clark, Gina Ochsner, Mischa Willett, and Lauren Winner.

In 2019, after some restructuring, Image announced a new editorial team including writer and philosophy professor at Calvin College, James K.A. Smith as Editor-in-Chief.

Glen Workshops 
The Glen Workshop, begun in 1995 and sponsored by Image, is a week-long summer conference featuring classes taught by professional poets, writers, and visual artists. The Glen is currently held annually at St. John's College in Santa Fé, New Mexico.  Each year the workshops center around a specific creative theme such as "Acts of Attention: The Art of Discovery," "The Generations in Our Bones: Art and Tradition," and "Border Crossings: Art and Risk."  Workshop classes often include fiction, poetry, memoir, songwriting, photography, and painting, among other options.

Arts and Faith 
Image hosts an online forum called Arts and Faith, which facilitates discussion on topics such as film, music, literature, visual art, theater and dance, and television and radio, as well as general faith and life topics. The forum releases Top 100 and Top 25 Film lists each year, both overall and in specific categories such as horror films or films about marriage. Film critics involved in Arts and Faith include Jeffrey Overstreet, Steven Greydanus, Peter T. Chattaway, and Michael Leary of Filmwell.

Denise Levertov Award 
Image co-sponsors the annual Levertov Award with the Seattle Pacific University English Department and its MFA Program in Creative Writing. Every spring they present the award to one artist or writer.  The award is named for the American poet Denise Levertov. Past recipients include:

 Madeline DeFrees
 Franz Wright
 Kathleen Norris
 Thomas Lynch
 Eugene Peterson
 Bret Lott
 Sam Phillips
 Bruce Cockburn
 Lucy Shaw
 Scott Cairns

References

External links
Official Website
 ; 
 .

1989 establishments in Washington (state)
Literary magazines published in the United States
Magazines established in 1989
Magazines published in Seattle
Quarterly magazines published in the United States
Religious magazines published in the United States
Seattle Pacific University
Visual arts magazines published in the United States